When The Bough Breaks is a 2016 American psychological thriller film directed by Jon Cassar and starring Morris Chestnut, Regina Hall, Theo Rossi and Jaz Sinclair. It was written by Jack Olsen. The screenplay concerns a woman who begins to develop a deadly crush on the husband of the couple she is surrogate mothering for.

Filming began on February 2, 2015 in New Orleans. The film was released on September 9, 2016, received generally negative reviews and grossed $30 million.

Plot 
A married couple in their 40s, named John and Laura Taylor (Morris Chestnut and Regina Hall) desperately want to have a baby, but they are unable to have a lasting pregnancy. Laura had already suffered three miscarriages in the past years. After attempting all other options, the couple hire a beautiful young woman named Anna (Jaz Sinclair) who agrees to become a gestational surrogate mother for the Taylors.

After Anna has a doctor's appointment, her boyfriend, Mike (Theo Rossi), doesn't pick her up, causing Anna to go to John's job for a ride home. That night, Laura receives an emergency phone call from Anna. John drives to her house seeing the police. It is then revealed that Mike assaulted Anna, leaving her face bloody and bruised. The police suggest Anna find another place to stay, and John offers for her to stay at the couple's house for the time being.

Everything seems fine for a while, until Anna starts to develop a fixation on John as the pregnancy moves further along. Anna's growing obsession interferes with what was a plan by her and her boyfriend, Mike, to scam the couple by demanding money. When Mike pushes Anna to demand money, she kills him.

Later, at a doctors appointment, John calls Laura trying to get her to the appointment. John and Anna find out that their baby is a boy. Later, at work John gets a call from Anna saying that they should go out for lunch, but he gets annoyed and Anna hangs up on him. John then avoids all calls from Anna. Eventually, he answers and she asks him why he's lying to her about having appointments. Anna walks into his office door and tries to seduce him but his boss enters and John prompts Anna to leave.

Anna later reveals her feelings to John and becomes outraged when he says he doesn't feel the same way. John is able to calm Anna down but Anna runs out of the guest house into the main house and picks up a knife. The police arrive and Anna lies and says she and John have sex every night. Laura and John then find out that Anna ordered a drug that will end her pregnancy. Laura and John devise a plan to get their unborn baby back by making John act as if he shares Anna's feelings. John and Anna meet at the aquarium. As Anna thinks she is being played, she walks away. John stops her and kisses her forcefully and asks her to come with him up to the family's lake house.

John returns home to Laura the next day. The plans works fine until Anna notices the two embracing each other. Anna leaves John a voicemail claiming the baby's coming. John leaves to go to the hospital while Laura stays home.

Anna returns to the Taylor house. She kills the family cat and then hits Laura in the head with a lamp, knocking her out. Anna then goes into labor. While in the hospital they discover that Anna has fled to the family lake-house with the baby. John manages to get the baby but Anna wakes up and a fight breaks out between the two of them. John throws her onto a cabinet which knocks her unconscious. John goes outside and Laura places the baby in the car. When Laura turns on the lights she sees Anna standing in front with a shotgun. Anna shoots at the car and misses but hits the window. Laura runs over Anna with her car, killing her.

The next morning, Laura, the baby, and John are sitting inside the lake house. They hear the police arrive and John turns to Laura and says, "It's going to be okay."

Cast 
 Morris Chestnut as John Taylor
 Regina Hall as Laura Taylor
 Jaz Sinclair as Anna Walsh / Anna Devost
 Theo Rossi as Mike Mitchell
 Romany Malco as Todd Decker
 Michael K. Williams as Roland White
 Glenn Morshower as Martin Cooper
 GiGi Erneta as Dr. Grace Park
 Maurice Johnson as Security Guard

Production 
On October 29, 2014, Sony's Screen Gems hired Jon Cassar to direct When the Bough Breaks, which Robert Shaye and Michael Lynne were producing. On November 18, 2014, Morris Chestnut and Regina Hall were cast to play the lead roles. On December 16, 2014, Jaz Sinclair signed on to co-star. On January 8, 2015, Theo Rossi was added to the film.

Filming 
Production was first set to begin in late January 2015 in New Orleans, Louisiana. Filming began on February 2, 2015 in New Orleans, and was confirmed by Screen Gems on February 11. Filming was taking place on St. Charles Avenue in early March, and was scheduled to end in mid-March 2015.

Release 
On March 30, 2015, Screen Gems announced that the film was slated to be released on September 16, 2016. On April 13, 2016, Sony Pictures released the first trailer for the film. In May 2016, the release date was moved up to September 9, 2016.

Home media 
When the Bough Breaks was released by Sony Pictures Home Entertainment on Blu-ray and DVD on December 27, 2016, with a digital release on December 13, 2016.

Reception

Box office
In the United States, When the Bough Breaks was released on September 9, 2016, alongside The Disappointments Room, Sully and The Wild Life, with the studio projecting it to gross $10–12 million from 2,246 theaters in its opening weekend. Some publications, however, had the film opening to $16–20 million, with some going as high as $25 million. The film grossed $5.3 million on its first day and $14.5 million in its opening weekend, finishing second at the box office.

Critical response
When the Bough Breaks was panned by critics. On Rotten Tomatoes, the film has an approval rating of 12%, based on 25 reviews, with an average rating of 3.6/10. The site's critical consensus reads, "Shallow, clichéd, and silly instead of suspenseful, When the Bough Breaks offers nothing domestic thriller fans haven't already seen before – and done far better." On Metacritic, the film has a score of 28 out of 100, based on reviews from 9 critics, indicating "generally unfavorable reviews". Audiences polled by CinemaScore gave the film an average grade of "B" on an A+ to F scale.

Many critics compared When the Bough Breaks to made-for-television films typically produced by Lifetime. Neil Genzlinger of The New York Times criticized Jon Cassar's direction, suggesting that "Hollywood needs to give the reductive, crazy, sex-obsessed female character a permanent rest."

In a review for Rogerebert.com, Nick Allen criticized the film's premise as "morally tasteless," writing, "Despite the story's initially completely baffling but welcome focus on characters for a change, the movie is baffled by the requirement of motivation, instead wanting to honor ideas of obsession while finding a way to get some dead body insert shots into the mix."

References

External links
 
 
 
 
 

2016 films
2010s erotic thriller films
2016 psychological thriller films
Adultery in films
African-American films
American erotic thriller films
American psychological thriller films
Erotic romance films
Films about sexuality
Films about stalking
Films shot in New Orleans
Films scored by John Frizzell (composer)
Screen Gems films
Films directed by Jon Cassar
2010s English-language films
2010s American films